Ulmus glabra 'Australis' is a Wych Elm cultivar described by Loudon in 1838, from a tree in the Royal Horticultural Society garden, as U. montana var. australis Hort.. 

Loudon's 'Australis' is not to be confused with Henry's U. campestris 'Australis', a tall southern European field elm or hybrid cultivar with an oval leaf and longer petiole.

Description
Loudon said the variety had "rather smaller leaves, and a more pendulous habit, than the species", but did "not appear to be different in any other respect".

Pests and diseases
See under Ulmus glabra.

Cultivation
No specimens are known to survive, though wych elms of a similar type sometimes occur among avenue and park plantings in Edinburgh.

References

Wych elm cultivar
Ulmus articles missing images
Ulmus
Missing elm cultivars